Chad David Taylor (born November 24, 1970, in York, Pennsylvania) is an American guitarist and backing vocalist for the band The Gracious Few and former guitarist for the band Live. Live have sold over 20 million records, including the 8× platinum album Throwing Copper.

Career

Taylor was the lead guitarist and backing vocalist of the band Live and had appeared on all their albums to June 2022. He met his Live bandmates aged 13 in middle school in York, Pennsylvania. When vocalist Ed Kowalczyk left the band in 2009, Taylor formed the band The Gracious Few along with Live bandmates Patrick Dahlheimer and Chad Gracey and Kevin Martin and Sean Hennesy from Candlebox. They released their debut album The Gracious Few in 2010. In 2011, he announced that Live would reform without Kowalczyk. In 2012, Live reformed with new lead singer Chris Shinn. In June 2022, he was fired from the band.

Taylor has produced records for other artists, including the 1996 album Happily Ever After by Solution A.D. and Play the Piano Drunk, the debut EP of his brother Adam Taylor.

Chad is a principal partner in the company Aurora Creative Group, which has developed shows for The History Channel, Discovery Channel, Telemundo, Food Network, HBO and Speed Channel. In addition he co-produced the feature films Home and Another Harvest Moon and was executive producer of the video The Barkan Method: Hot Yoga which features his wife Lisa.

In June, 2022, Live lead singer Ed Kowalczyk announced that Taylor had been fired from the band.

In November 2022, Taylor was sued by a former business associate for fraudulent misrepresentations and failing to pay alleged debts. The lawsuit contained detailed allegations and documents demonstrating that Mr. Taylor had grossly inflated his net worth before and during the transaction. In response to the suit, former bandmate Chad Gracey stated "unfortunately for my former band mate who tends to deny the truth no matter what, the note is real and the supporting information in the claim seems irrefutable."

Personal life
Taylor is married to Lisa, a yoga practitioner. They have three children, Ruby Lou, Scarlett and Delilah. They live in Lancaster, Pennsylvania.

Discography

With Live
 all albums to date

With The Gracious Few
 The Gracious Few (2010)

Equipment used
Taylor's equipment was listed in a September 2010 interview with Guitar Edge magazine.

Guitars: Two Gibson 1959 Les Paul Reissues.
Amps and Cabinets: Early 1960s Marshall JMP, Marshall 4x12 cabinet with Celestion 30-watt Greenbacks, Orange AD30HTC.

See also

 List of alternative-rock artists
 List of guitarists
 List of people from Baltimore
 List of people from Lancaster County, Pennsylvania
 List of people from York, Pennsylvania

References

External links
 
 
 Aurora Creative Group

1970 births
20th-century American musicians
21st-century American musicians
Alternative rock guitarists
American alternative rock musicians
American film producers
American hard rock musicians
Record producers from Pennsylvania
American rock guitarists
American male guitarists
Live (band) members
Living people
Musicians from Baltimore
Musicians from Lancaster, Pennsylvania
Musicians from York, Pennsylvania
American pop rock musicians
Post-grunge musicians
The Gracious Few members
Guitarists from Maryland
Guitarists from Pennsylvania